Pensil Neighborhood is located in the Miguel Hidalgo borough of Mexico City. It has been known as a tough neighborhood but changes have been underway for quite some time for improvement.

Miguel Hidalgo, Mexico City
Neighborhoods in Mexico City